{{Taxobox
| image = QuinqueloculinaDonegalBay.jpg
| image_caption = Quinqueloculina sp. from Donegal Bay, Ireland.
| domain = Eukaryota
| unranked_regnum = SAR
| unranked_subregnum = Rhizaria
| phylum = Retaria
| subphylum = Foraminifera
| classis = Tubothalamea
| ordo = Miliolida
| superfamilia = Miliolacea
| familia = Miliolidae
| familia_authority = 
| subdivision_ranks = Genera/ Subfamilies
| subdivision = 
Genus Massilina
Subfamily Fabulariinae
Subfamily Miliolinae
Subfamily Miliolinellinae
Subfamily Quinqueloculininae
Subfamily Tubinellinae
}}Miliolidae is a family in the superfamily Miliolacea'' of miliolid foraminifera.

References

External links
 Miliolacea on www.itis.gov

Tubothalamea
Foraminifera families